Ronur Venkateshappa Devraj (born 3 Dec 1957) is an Indian politician who served as chairman of the Karnataka State Road Transport Corporation (KSRTC) from 2000 to October 2007. He is the general seceratory of KPCC and Member of AICC. He served as MLA of Chamarajpet Constituency. After delimitation of Chamrajpet constituency, he became the Congress candidate for Chickpet.

References 

 99-year-old government school faces threat of demolition - The Hindu

1957 births
Politicians from Bangalore
Kannada people
Living people
Members of the Karnataka Legislative Council
Indian National Congress politicians from Karnataka